Madame Ravissa de Turin (b. late 18th century; died February 20, 1807) was an Italian singer and composer. She was from Turin, but apparently lived in Paris from 1778 until 1783. She published six sonatas for harpsichord in Paris in 1778, on which she was described as Maîtresse de Clavecin et de Chant italien. A copy of the sonatas survived in the collection of Kaiser Franz II of Austria. In 1933 the manuscript was discovered in storage at Steiermärkischer Musikverein by musicologist Ernst Fritz Schmid, and is now housed at Osterreichische Nationalbibliothek in Vienna. In 1778 her work was described in the Parisian Almanach Musical as "bold modulations that the Italians love and our timorous composers do not dare to allow themselves."

Works
Six Sonatas pour le Clavecin op. 1, Sonaten I-III by Madame Ravissa De Turin. Edited by Claudia Schweitzer. For harpsichord or period instrument and modern pianos. Piano (Harpsichord), 2-hands. Published by Furore Verlag. ISBN M-50012-934-9.
Six Sonatas pour le Clavecin op. 1, Sonaten IV-VI by Madame Ravissa De Turin. Edited by Claudia Schweitzer. For harpsichord or period instrument and modern pianos. Piano (Harpsichord), 2-hands. Published by Furore Verlag. ISBN M-50012-960-8.

References

Italian women classical composers
Italian classical pianists
Italian women pianists
Year of birth missing
1807 deaths
Women classical pianists
18th-century Italian composers
18th-century keyboardists
18th-century Italian women
18th-century women composers